The Faroe Islands defeated Austria 1–0 on 12 September 1990 in a UEFA Euro 1992 qualifying match at Landskrona IP in Landskrona, Sweden. The result is notable as one of the biggest shocks in football history, as the Faroe Islands were playing their first ever competitive match with a team composed of amateur players, while Austria had played at the 1990 FIFA World Cup in Italy less than three months earlier.

Background
The Faroe Islands Football Association became a member of FIFA on 2 July 1988 and joined UEFA on 18 April 1990. Austria, in turn, played at the 1990 FIFA World Cup in Italy less than three months earlier and were eliminated in the group stage.

Because the Faroe Islands did not have a suitable football stadium, their national team chose to play its matches in Sweden, using Landskrona IP as their home ground.

Match

Details

Aftermath
Austria coach Josef Hickersberger resigned the day after the loss. In the return fixture, played on 22 April 1991 at Salzburg, Austria beat the Faroes 3–0. Neither team managed to win against the other opponents of the group and finished at the bottom, with Austria in 4th and the Faroe Islands in 5th.

Hickersberger returned to coach the Austria national team in 2006, quitting after UEFA Euro 2008, which Austria co-hosted with Switzerland. The two teams were again scheduled to play in October at Tórshavn for the 2010 FIFA World Cup qualification, and again in Group F of the 2022 FIFA World Cup qualification games.

References

External links
 Full match on Kringvarp Føroya website
 Video about the match on Visit Faroe Islands YouTube channel

UEFA Euro 1992 qualifying
1990 in Faroe Islands football
1990–91 in Austrian football
UEFA European Championship matches
Austria, 1990
Faroe Islands, 1990
September 1990 sports events in Europe
Football in Landskrona
20th century in Skåne County
Sports competitions in Skåne County